The discography of the American jazz artist Euge Groove consists of eight studio albums and eleven promo singles. Listed are also several appearances in records where he appeared as a sideman, but not the re-issues, unless they are counted separately from the original works in the charts. The discography shows the peak weekly chart positions in the United States for jazz[a] and heatseekers charts.[b]

Euge Groove made his debut as professional musician in 1987 as sideman, collecting since the beginning good results on mainstream, such as the Exposé's No. 1 hit, "Seasons Change". His reputation went very quickly to high levels, arriving to collaborate with several music icons, like Joe Cocker, Elton John, Eros Ramazzotti and Richard Marx. Finally in the late 1990s, he decided to begin a solo career and he published his first solo studio album, Euge Groove (2000) for Warner Bros. Records. The album was a low seller and peaked at No. 25 on the Top Contemporary Jazz Albums. The follower, Play Date (2002), peaked at No. 10 on the same chart and introduced Groove to the contemporary jazz audience. After this result, Euge Groove left Warner Bros. for Narada Jazz and released Livin' Large (2004), which peaked at No. 4 on the contemporary jazz chart. The follower, Just Feels Right (2005), did better, peaking at No. 3 and spawning Groove's first jazz hit, "Chillaxin" (2006), No. 3 on Smooth Jazz Songs.

In 2007, Groove reached the commercial peak publishing Born 2 Groove. It was No. 1 on the Top Contemporary Jazz Albums and spawned four smooth jazz hits (three of them in top 10), including his first two No. 1 singles: "Born 2 Groove" and "Religify." After this great success, Groove left Narada Jazz for Shanachie Entertainment, where he continued to release successful albums and promo singles for the contemporary jazz audience. Sunday Morning (2009) peaked at No. 2 and contains two top 10 hits, including the No. 1 hit from the same name. S7even Large (2011) peaked at No. 3 and had only a top 10 hit. In 2012, Groove came back on the top of the albums chart with House of Groove, that spawned a new No. 1 hit with the title track.

Albums

Studio albums

Singles

Promo singles

As lead artist

As featured artist

Other appearances

As sideman

 For every year (here reported chronologically) the albums are listed alphabetically by the last name of the artist.

Notes

a ^ Jazz Albums contains traditional and contemporary jazz albums and unlike of Top Traditional Jazz Albums and Top Contemporary Jazz Albums, it is available only on billboard.com and billboard.biz
b ^ Top Heatseekers Albums contains only albums of artists that never entered in the top 100 of the Billboard 200 or in top 10 of the Top R&B/Hip-Hop Albums, Top Country Albums, Top Latin Albums, Top Christian Albums or Top Gospel Albums. There is a similar chart also for the songs, called Top Heatseekers Songs and lists songs of artists that never entered in the top 50 of the Billboard Hot 100 (or the top 50 of the Hot 100 Airplay prior to December 5, 1998).

References

External links
 Euge Groove Official website
 Euge Groove on AllMusic
 Steve Grove on AllMusic

Discographies of American artists
Jazz discographies